Popeye is a comic and cartoon character:

Popeye may also refer to:

Based on the cartoon character
Popeye (comic strip), is an comic strip created by E.C. Segar in 1929.
Popeye (film), a 1980 film starring Robin Williams
Popeye (video game), a 1982 video game
Popeye (Game Boy video game), a 1990 video game for the Game Boy
Popeye 2, a 1991 video game
Popeye: Rush for Spinach, a 2005 video game

Fictional characters
Jimmy "Popeye" Doyle, in the films The French Connection, French Connection II and Popeye Doyle
Popeye (Faulkner character), in William Faulkner's novel Sanctuary

As a nickname
Hank Erickson (1907-1964), American professional baseball catcher
Ronald Popeye Jones (born 1970), American National Basketball Association assistant coach and former player
Greg Halford (born 1984), English footballer nicknamed "Popeye" for his missile-like throw-ins
Jean-Paul van Poppel (born 1962), Dutch former racing cyclist
Miloš Stojanović (footballer, born 1984), Serbian footballer
Jhon Jairo Velásquez (1962–2020), former hitman for Pablo Escobar and the Medellín drugs cartel
Robert Wynn (soldier) (1921-2000), World War II US Army soldier, portrayed in the miniseries Band of Brothers
Don Zimmer (1931-2014), former Major League Baseball player, coach and manager

Other uses
Popeye (boat), a series of historic pleasure launches used on the Torrens River, Adelaide, Australia
Popeye (magazine), Japanese men's fashion magazine
Popeye (missile), Israeli standoff air-to-surface missile, when used by the US code named AGM-142 Have Nap
Popeye (seal), a female harbor seal of Friday Harbor, San Juan Island, Washington, US
Popeye, software for handling chess problems
Popeyes, a chain of fried chicken fast food restaurants
Operation Popeye, a US military operation to increase rains over Vietnam during the Vietnam War
Popeye Moto Club, a former outlaw motorcycle club in Quebec, Canada
"Popular Demand (Popeyes)", a 2009 song by Clipse from Til the Casket Drops

See also 
 "Popeye The Hitchhiker", a 1962 song by Chubby Checker
 Pop-Eyes, 1983 album by Danielle Dax
 Pop Eyed, a 1996 New Zealand compilation album
 Popeye the Sailor (disambiguation)

Lists of people by nickname

he:פופאי